
Reflector is the sixth studio album by the California soft rock group Pablo Cruise. The album charted slightly higher than its immediate predecessor, but still managed only to reach #34 in the US. Two singles were released from the album; "Cool Love" and "Slip Away", reaching #13 and #75 respectively in the US. Produced by established and well-known R&B producer Tom Dowd, fans remarked that the album had a different feel to it.

Two changes in members were made before the album was released. After just two albums, bassist and vocalist Bruce Day was replaced by John Pierce while additional guitarist Angelo Rossi was added. Furthermore, keyboardist Cory Lerios sang lead vocals on "This Time" and "Inside/Outside", something he had not done on previous albums.

Track listing

Side One
"This Time" (Cory Lerios) - 3:38
"Cool Love" (David Jenkins, Lerios, John Pierce) - 3:53
"Don't Let the Magic Disappear" (Jenkins, Lerios) - 5:15
"One More Night" (Jenkins, Lerios, Pierce) - 3:58
"Jenny" (Jenkins, Lerios) - 3:48

Side Two
"Slip Away" (Jenkins, Chuck Lutz, Pierce) - 3:46
"That's When" (Jenkins, Lerios) - 3:53
"Inside/Outside" (Lerios, Pierce) - 3:07
"Paradise (Let Me Take You Into)" (Jenkins, Pierce) - 2:59
"Drums in the Night" (Jenkins, Lerios) - 5:53

Charts

Personnel
David Jenkins - guitars, vocals
Steve Price - percussion, drums
John Pierce - bass, vocals
Cory Lerios - piano, keyboards, vocals
Angelo Rossi - guitar, vocals

Production
Tom Dowd: producer, mixing
Greg Price: engineer, mixing
Rick Sanchez: second engineer
Chuck Kirkpatrick, Steve Klein: assistant engineers
Bernie Grundman: mastering at A&M Studios, Hollywood

References

Pablo Cruise albums
1981 albums
Albums produced by Tom Dowd
A&M Records albums